= Hefei No.7 High School =

School in Anhui Province, China

Coordinates: 31.8544°N 117.2885°E

- Chinese: 合肥市第七中学
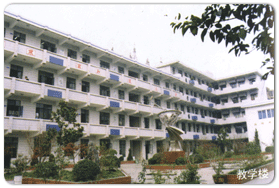

Information
- Motto: Aspire for being a human, desire to be an elite
- Established: 1956; 70 years ago

Hefei No. 7 High School (Chinese: 合肥市第七中学) is a high school in Hefei, Anhui Province, China, located at 106 Wuhu Road, Baohe, Hefei, Anhui.

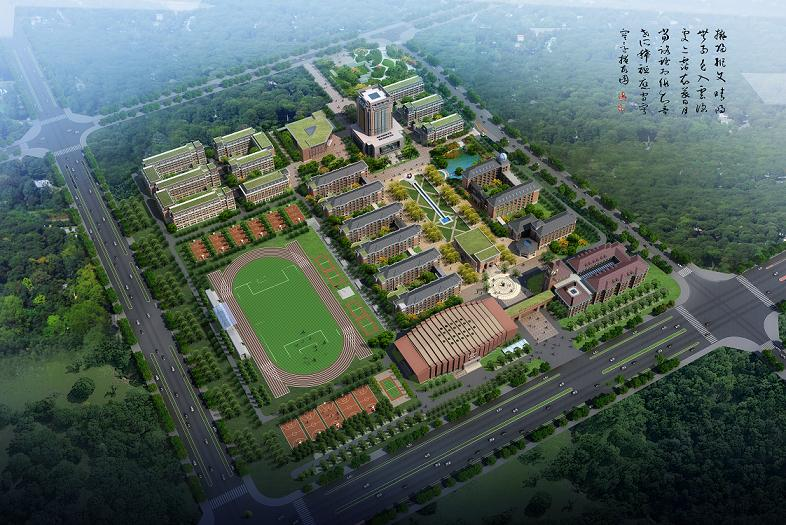
the blueprint of the new campus of Hefei No.7 High School

Hefei No.7 High School is one of the Model High Schools in Anhui. It is written as “合肥市第七中学” in Chinese. The school has won numerous honorary titles (e.g. the Civilization unit in Anhui, the Green School in Anhui), and aims to provide opportunities for students to study abroad, focusing on sending students to the Top 100 universities in the US. The school motto is “Aspire for being a human, desire to be an elite.”

The school was established in 1956. Instructions takes place in six buildings, and the school's architecture mixes the Hui style and a minimalist European style.
